Milewo may refer to the following places:
Milewo, Kuyavian-Pomeranian Voivodeship (north-central Poland)
Milewo, Grajewo County in Podlaskie Voivodeship (north-east Poland)
Milewo, Łomża County in Podlaskie Voivodeship (north-east Poland)
Milewo, Mońki County in Podlaskie Voivodeship (north-east Poland)
Milewo, Siemiatycze County in Podlaskie Voivodeship (north-east Poland)
Milewo, Płońsk County in Masovian Voivodeship (east-central Poland)
Milewo, Sierpc County in Masovian Voivodeship (east-central Poland)
Milewo, Warmian-Masurian Voivodeship (north Poland)